Stalin Motta Vaquiro  (born 28 March 1984) is a Colombian football midfielder who plays for Cucuta Deportivo.

Club career
Most of his career was spent playing for La Equidad in the Categoría Primera A.

He was responsible for his former club La Equidad top standing in the Colombian league. When he was younger he was regarded as a promising player for Colombia.

After long negotiations he was transferred to Atlético Nacional in January 2010, coming as a key part to help the team that Ramon Cabrero will use to affront the challenges.

Honors
La Equidad
Categoria Primera B (2006)
Copa Colombia (2008)

External links

1984 births
Living people
Colombian footballers
Colombian expatriate footballers
Categoría Primera A players
Categoría Primera B players
Ecuadorian Serie A players
Independiente Santa Fe footballers
La Equidad footballers
Atlético Nacional footballers
Barcelona S.C. footballers
Association football midfielders
Footballers from Bogotá
Colombian expatriate sportspeople in Ecuador
Expatriate footballers in Ecuador